Sport Vereniging Santos  is an association football club from Nieuw Nickerie, Suriname. The club currently compete in the SVB Eerste Divisie, the highest tier of football in Suriname.

History
Founded on 9 September 1964, S.V. Santos are the most successful football club from the Nickerie District in Suriname. They play in the Nickerie Voetbal Stadion to a capacity of 3,400 people, the fourth largest stadium in the country. Having spent spells in both the Hoofdklasse and Eerste Klasse, the club currently compete in the lower divisions, having won the Lidbondentoernooi in 2015. The club were also able to win the Interdistrictentoernooi in both 1979 and 1991. In 2012 the club lost both its best players Xavier Perk and Gavinne Joseph to S.V. Leo Victor while competing in the Eerste Klasse, relegating back to the lower divisions the following season. In 2015 they promoted back to the Eerste Klasse.

Achievements
Interdistrictentoernooi: 2
Winners: 1979, 1991

Lidbondentoernooi: 1
Winners: 2015

References

Santos
Santos
1964 establishments in Suriname
Association football clubs established in 1964